The 1989–90 SK Rapid Wien season was the 92nd season in club history.

Squad

Squad and statistics

Squad statistics

Fixtures and results

League

Cup

UEFA Cup

References

1989-90 Rapid Wien Season
Rapid